Scotopteryx mucronata, the lead belle, is a species of moth in the family Geometridae. It is found in most of Europe, Turkey, Ukraine, West Siberia.

The wingspan is 30–38 mm. The ground colour of the forewing is grey to brownish grey in colour. There is a distinctive brown median band and bounded by darker cross lines. The centre (discal) spot is usually drop-shaped. However, the pattern is variable. The rear wing is greyish. Very similar to Scotopteryx luridata . See Townsend et al.

Adults are on wing from May to June in one generation per year.

The larvae feed on Ulex and Cytisus species. The species overwinters in the larval stage.

References

External links
Lepiforum.de

Moths described in 1763
Scotopteryx
Moths of Europe
Moths of Asia
Taxa named by Giovanni Antonio Scopoli